CTM Altromercato is Italy's largest alternative trading organization. It was founded in 1988 in Bolzano, Italy,  and originally operated as a cooperative (CTM or Cooperazione Terzo Mondo). In June 1998, the organization became a consortium of world shops called Ctm altromercato. It now includes more than 118 organisations (associations and cooperatives) which are responsible for the management of 230 worldshops throughout Italy.

External links
Ctm altromercato

Alternative trading organizations
Organizations established in 1988